The Latvian Women's Cup (Latvian: Sieviešu futbola kauss) is the annual cup competition of women's football teams in Latvia.

Format
The competition is a knockout (single elimination) tournament.

List of finals
The list of finals: No editions held up to 2013.

See also
Latvian Football Cup, men's equivalent

References

External links
Competition history at lff.lv (Latvian)

Latv
Cup
Women